LAFCO may refer to:

 Los Angeles Filmmakers Cooperative, a bohemian collective of filmmakers and musicians who work out of a converted school bus, founded by Tao Ruspoli
 Local Agency Formation Commission, a political entity sponsored by the State of California, existing in all counties of California, regulating the formation and development of local governmental subdivisions and other agencies